Kentucky Route 224 (KY 224) is a  state highway in Kentucky that runs from U.S. Route 62 and Vanmeter Street in Clarkson to Kentucky Route 357 west of Magnolia via Upton.

Route description
KY 224 begins at a junction with U.S. Route 62 (US 62) in Clarkson, in Grayson County. It also has a junction with the Wendell H. Ford Western Kentucky Parkway at exit 112. KY 224 continues eastward to Millerstown, where it intersects KY 479 and then crosses the Nolin River into Hart County. The highway briefly runs through the northwesternmost part of Hart County, and enters southern Hardin County about  later and intersects US 31W (Dixie Highway) at Upton.

KY 224 crosses the exit 76 interchange of Interstate 65 (I-65) and ends at a junction with KY 357 in rural southern LaRue County east of Upton and southwest of Hodgenville.

Major intersections

References

External links
Kentucky Roads

0224
Transportation in Grayson County, Kentucky
Transportation in Hart County, Kentucky
Transportation in Hardin County, Kentucky
Transportation in LaRue County, Kentucky